Alverstone Mead Local Nature Reserve is a lowland freshwater wetland nature reserve close to Sandown, Isle of Wight. it is a part of the Alverstone Marshes Site of Special Scientific Interest.

The site is on the floodplain of the Eastern Yar, and is a popular spot for birdwatchers. The old trackbed of the Newport-Sandown railway runs through it, and is now a cycleway. In addition, the station house of Alverstone railway station, now a private residence, is still intact, and sits adjacent to Alverstone Mead.

It is owned by the Isle of Wight Council and leased to the Wight Nature Fund.

References

External links
 Alverstone Mead - Wetland focal Nature Reserve, Newchurch Parish website
Isle of Wight Council entry

Marshes of England
Local Nature Reserves on the Isle of Wight
Sites of Special Scientific Interest on the Isle of Wight